The John F. Limehouse Memorial Bridge, located about  west of downtown Charleston, South Carolina, was completed in 2003. It replaced an obsolete low-level swing bridge over the Stono River. The current bridge, which crosses a channel between Johns Island and St. Andrews Parish, an area generally called West Ashley, was completed under a partnership between the South Carolina Department of Transportation (SCDOT) and the United States Coast Guard.

Purpose
The former swing bridge, built in 1929, was an obstruction to vessel traffic, thus removal was mandated by the U.S. Coast Guard in an Order to Alter issued in 1994, leaving only a few swing bridges in the Coast Guard’s Seventh District, from Key West, Florida, to the northernmost areas of South Carolina.

The current,  concrete structure is a high-level, fixed span. The new structure accommodates four lanes of traffic and provides access to Johns, Kiawah, Seabrook, and Wadmalaw Islands.

Design and construction
Design of the bridge was contracted to Ralph Whitehead Associates, Inc., of Charlotte, North Carolina. Construction was awarded to Jones Brothers, Inc., of Mt. Juliet, Tennessee. The Coast Guard provided about $21 million of the total $30 million bridge cost, with the rest paid by the State.

The State government donated the debris to the South Carolina Department of Natural Resources artificial reef program. The current bridge was opened to traffic in June 2003, approximately two months ahead of schedule.

See also
List of bridges documented by the Historic American Engineering Record in South Carolina

References

National Oceanic and Atmospheric Administration locations of tide stations

U.S. Coast Guard Document, Release 10-11, October 27, 2003

External links
 of previous structure

Bridges completed in 2003
Road bridges in South Carolina
Limehouse
Historic American Engineering Record in South Carolina
Monuments and memorials in South Carolina
Concrete bridges in the United States